USS Louis H. Wilson Jr. (DDG-126) will be an  of the United States Navy. She is the second of the Flight III variants and 76th overall in the class. She is named after U.S. Marine Corps General Louis H. Wilson Jr., recipient of the Medal of Honor. On 17 September 2016 she was named by Secretary of the Navy Ray Mabus.

Bath Iron Works began fabrication of the vessel on 3 March 2020.

Namesake
Louis Hugh Wilson Jr. (1920–2005) was the 26th Commandant of the Marine Corps from 1975 to 1979, and a recipient of the Medal of Honor during World War II. Born in Brandon, Mississippi, He held a Bachelor of Arts degree in 1941 from Millsaps College, Jackson, Mississippi—where he participated in football and track. Wilson was also an active member of the Alpha Iota chapter of Pi Kappa Alpha fraternity, initiated on February 23, 1939.  A veteran of the War in Vietnam, General Wilson was the first Marine Corps Commandant to serve full-time on the Joint Chiefs of Staff.

References

External links

 

Arleigh Burke-class destroyers
Proposed ships of the United States Navy